Al-Majd Club  is a Saudi Arabian football (soccer) team in Yanbu playing at the Saudi Fourth Division.

References

Majd
Majd
Majd
Majd